Farewell is a 1983 Soviet drama film based on Valentin Rasputin's novel Farewell to Matyora and directed by Elem Klimov.

Plot 

The existence of the village of Matyora, located on a small island of the same name, is threatened with flooding by the construction of a dam to serve a hydroelectric power plant. The villagers oppose their displacement and the loss of their traditions, but are eventually forced to bid farewell to their homeland.

Cast 
Stefaniya Stanyuta as old Darya
Lev Durov as Pavel Pinegin
Aleksei Petrenko as Vorontsov
Leonid Kryuk as Petrukha
Vadim Yakovenko as Andrei Pinegin
Yuri Katin-Yartsev as Bogodul
Denis Luppov as Kolyana

Production history 

While scouting locations in June 1979 for her planned adaptation of the ecological fable, original director Larisa Shepitko died in a car accident along with four members of her shooting team. After a delay the project was finally completed in 1981 by her widower Elem Klimov and although shelved for a further two years, was eventually given a limited release in the Soviet Union in 1983. Originally chosen to open the 1984 Berlin Film Festival, it was initially refused an export licence until three years later when it was screened in Berlin.

References

External links
 

 Article on Proshchanie at Film Reference
  Part 1 on Mosfilm's Youtube channel
  Part 2 on Mosfilm's Youtube channel

1983 films
1983 drama films
Soviet drama films
Russian drama films
1980s Russian-language films
Films directed by Elem Klimov
Films set in Russia
Mosfilm films
Films scored by Alfred Schnittke
Films based on Russian novels